The 1991 ECAC Hockey Men's Ice Hockey Tournament was the 30th tournament in league history. It was played between February 26 and March 10, 1991. Preliminary and quarterfinal games were played at home team campus sites, while the 'final four' games were played at the Boston Garden in Boston, Massachusetts. By winning the tournament, Clarkson received the ECAC's automatic bid to the 1991 NCAA Division I Men's Ice Hockey Tournament.

Format
The tournament featured four rounds of play. The two teams that finish below tenth place in the standings are not eligible for tournament play. In the first round, the seventh and tenth seeds and the eighth and ninth seeds each play a single game to determine the final qualifying teams for the quarterfinals. In the quarterfinals the first seed and lower ranked qualifier, the second and higher ranked qualifier, the third seed and sixth seed and the fourth seed and fifth seed played a two-game series to determine the winner. In the two games no overtime was permitted and if the two teams remained tied after the two games then a 10-minute minigame would be played where a sudden-death overtime was allowed if the scheduled time did not produce a victor. After the opening round every series becomes a single-elimination game. In the semifinals, the highest seed plays the lowest remaining seed while the two remaining teams play with the winners advancing to the championship game and the losers advancing to the third place game. The tournament champion receives an automatic bid to the 1991 NCAA Division I Men's Ice Hockey Tournament.

Conference standings
Note: GP = Games played; W = Wins; L = Losses; T = Ties; PTS = Points; GF = Goals For; GA = Goals Against

Bracket
Teams are reseeded after the first two rounds

Note: * denotes overtime period(s)

Preliminary round

(7) Colgate vs. (10) Princeton

(8) Brown vs. (9) Yale

Quarterfinals

(1) Clarkson vs. (9) Yale

(2) Cornell vs. (7) Colgate

(3) St. Lawrence vs. (6) Vermont

(4) Harvard vs. (5) Rensselaer

Semifinals

(1) Clarkson vs. (4) Harvard

(2) Cornell vs. (3) St. Lawrence

Championship

(1) Clarkson vs. (3) St. Lawrence

Tournament awards

All-Tournament Team
F Scott Thomas (Clarkson)
F Andy Pritchard (St. Lawrence)
F Hugo Belanger* (Clarkson)
D Dave Tretowicz (Clarkson)
D Daniel Laperrière (St. Lawrence)
G Chris Rogles (Clarkson)
* Most Outstanding Player(s)

References

External links
ECAC Hockey
1990–91 ECAC Hockey Standings
1990–91 NCAA Standings

ECAC Hockey Men's Ice Hockey Tournament
ECAC tournament